Jacob Wilhelm Nordan (23 February 1824 – 11 April 1892) was a Danish-born, Norwegian architect. During his career, he was one of the most prolific church architects in Norway.

Biography
Nordan was born in Copenhagen, Denmark and came to Norway as a child with his mother. He attended the Royal Drafting School (Den Kongelige Tegneskole) in Christiania (now Oslo), where Johannes Flintoe,  Christian Heinrich Grosch and Johan Henrik Nebelong were among his teachers. From 1849 to 1852, Nordan worked under architect Johan Henrik Nebelong as assistant and building manager during the construction of Oscarshall.  From 1852 to 1855, he studied   at the Royal Danish Academy of Fine Arts in Copenhagen  and received travel grants to Bavaria and Austria.

In 1856, he established architectural office in Christiania, while he also taught at the Royal Drafting School. While working for the Ministry of the Church of Norway, he designed nearly one hundred churches. Among his designs are also Fritzøehus Manor located outside Larvik, the former fire and police station in Oslo at Møllergata 19, and the bazaars on the public square at Youngstorget in downtown Oslo. 

In 1860, Nordan married Danish artist Henriette Dorothea Henius (1826-1903). Their son Victor Nordan (1862-1933) was also an architect. He became his father's partner in 1887 and took over the company at his death 1892.

Gallery

References

External links
Design drawings by Jacob Wilhelm Nordan (nasjonalmuseet)

1824 births
1892 deaths
People from Copenhagen
Royal Danish Academy of Fine Arts alumni
Danish emigrants to Norway
19th-century Norwegian architects
Burials at the Cemetery of Our Saviour
Norwegian ecclesiastical architects